William Mejia (born November 15, 1996) is an American soccer player who plays for Greenville Triumph in USL League One.

Career

Youth
Mejia was a three sport athlete during high school at Falls Church High School, playing basketball, football and soccer. He was named All-Conference player in basketball and the Conference 13 Player of the Year in football. For soccer, Mejia was a three-time, first-team all-conference selection, and a first-team all-region selection on two occasions. He also played club soccer for local side Arlington Strikers for four years, helping the team to four State Cup Final Four appearances, and winning the title twice.

College
In 2015, Mejia attended Virginia Tech to play college soccer. He went on to redshirt his freshman season in 2015, eventually going on to make 65 appearances for the Hokies, and scoring a single goal. In 2016, he was named Top Drawer Soccer Best Freshman XI First Team.

Amateur
In both 2018 and 2019, Mejia played with NPSL side Northern Virginia United, but didn't make an appearance for the club.

Professional
On April 8, 2021, Mejia signed with Greenville Triumph of USL League One. He made his professional debut on July 4, 2021, appearing as an 86th-minute substitute during a 3–0 win over New England Revolution II.

References

External links 
 

1996 births
American soccer players
Association football defenders
Greenville Triumph SC players
Living people
People from Falls Church, Virginia
Soccer players from Virginia
USL League One players
Virginia Tech Hokies men's soccer players